Operation Sunable was a military operation by Australian forces in Timor during World War II. It consisted of Lieutenant Williams, and Sergeants White, Shand and Curran.

The party was inserted into Timor on June 23, 1945. Within  hours of its arrival, the party was reported by pro Japanese locals. For the next week it was dogged by Japanese patrols and ambushed three times before Williams was fatally wounded in a fight on 5 July 1945.

The other three evaded capture for another week until lack of food and water forced them to surrender. During their various encounters, four Japanese were killed and several more wounded.

It was one of a series of disastrous missions Australia sent behind enemy lines in Timor.

References

Notes

Sunable
1945 in Portuguese Timor
Sunable
South West Pacific theatre of World War II
Sunable